Igor Szkukalek (born 1 July 1976) is a former Slovak footballer who played for clubs in Slovakia, the Czech Republic and Hungary.

Szkukalek made 37 appearances in the Czech first division for SFC Opava and FK Drnovice. He made 90 appearances in the Hungarian first division with Ferencvárosi TC and Lombard-Pápa TFC.

External links

Profile at HLSZ.hu
Ferencvárosi profile 

1976 births
Living people
Slovak footballers
FK Drnovice players
SFC Opava players
Expatriate footballers in Hungary
Expatriate footballers in the Czech Republic

Association football defenders
Sportspeople from Dunajská Streda